Tom Briese (born April 12, 1959) is an American politician who has served in the Nebraska Legislature from the 41st district since 2017.

References

1959 births
21st-century American politicians
Living people
Republican Party Nebraska state senators